is a Japanese visual novel studio founded in 2002. It is an adult game brand under , a software company located in Mitaka, Tokyo. Palette is known for developing Mashiroiro Symphony, their ninth title released in 2009. It was ported to the PlayStation Portable and was adapted into an anime television series in 2011.

Works

Palette 
Between 2002 and 2019, sixteen works were released from Palette, and the upcoming seventeenth work will be released in 2020.

Palette Darkside 
Palette Darkside (Palette darkside) is a sub-brand of Palette. Their sole work Kegareta Neoro: Taorareta Shimai was released on November 12, 2004. Palette Darkside's official website was closed on April 21, 2007, when Palette announced the first report of Sakura Strasse.

Internet radio show 
This series is sponsored by Purple Software and Palette, and the show is hosted by Hideki Ogihara and Kazane. The show title was Homerarete Nobiru Radio PP at first, but later it changed to Homerarete Nobiru Radio Z on May 5, 2011.

Palette Broadcasting Station 
 began to broadcast at Niconicommunity on May 2, 2012.

Notes 

Japanese

References 

Palette

External links 
 Palette official website 
 Palette / Palette Darkside official website on Internet Archive (November 17, 2004) 
 Homerarete Nobiru Radio Z at Internet Radio Station "Onsen" 
 Palette Broadcasting Station at Niconicommunity 
 
 

Japanese companies established in 2002
Amusement companies of Japan
Software companies based in Tokyo
Video game companies established in 2002
Hentai companies
Video game companies of Japan